The Tyndall Report is a journalism newsletter which has been tracking and analyzing nightly newscasts since 1987. It is run and published by Andrew Tyndall, who is also the head of the New York-based company ADT Research. The website's stated goal is to analyze and contextualize all major network weekday evening newscasts on ABC (ABC World News), CBS (CBS Evening News), and NBC (NBC Nightly News). Tyndall Reports analyzing the amount of coverage given to certain people and issues have been cited in several media outlets during U.S. presidential election cycles. For instance, a 2015 Tyndall Report found that Donald Trump was by far the most-covered candidate in the 2016 U.S. presidential election, receiving over a quarter of all election coverage on ABC, NBC, and CBS. The report was cited by CNN Money and U.S. News & World Report.

References

External links

i Journal News

American news websites
1987 establishments in the United States